The Pleasantville Public Schools are a comprehensive community public school district that serves students in kindergarten through twelfth grade from the City of Pleasantville, in Atlantic County, New Jersey, United States. The district is one of 31 former Abbott districts statewide that were established pursuant to the decision by the New Jersey Supreme Court in Abbott v. Burke which are now referred to as "SDA Districts" based on the requirement for the state to cover all costs for school building and renovation projects in these districts under the supervision of the New Jersey Schools Development Authority.
As of the 2018–19 school year, the district, comprised of seven schools, had an enrollment of 3,757 students and 314.2 classroom teachers (on an FTE basis), for a student–teacher ratio of 12.0:1.

The district is classified by the New Jersey Department of Education as being in District Factor Group "A", the lowest of eight groupings. District Factor Groups organize districts statewide to allow comparison by common socioeconomic characteristics of the local districts. From lowest socioeconomic status to highest, the categories are A, B, CD, DE, FG, GH, I and J.

Students from Absecon attend the district's high school for ninth through twelfth grades as part of a sending/receiving relationship with the Absecon Public School District. Absecon has sought to end its agreement with Pleasantville and send its students to Absegami High School under a new sending/receiving relationship with the Greater Egg Harbor Regional High School District that Absecon argues would give its students a better education at a lower cost, without negatively impacting the demographics in Pleasantville High School. About 10% of Absecon's graduating students have been choosing to attend Pleasantville High School, for which the Absecon district has been paying $18,000 per student each year.

History
Circa 2014 the dissolution of some charter schools was a factor in an increase in the student population, despite a decline in casino jobs.

Awards and recognition
For the 2005-06 school year, Washington Avenue Elementary School was one of 22 schools statewide selected as Governor's School of Excellence Winners, an award given to schools that demonstrated significant improvement over the previous two academic years.

In March 2007, the Commissioner of the New Jersey Department of Education appointed a monitor to supervise and address a series of issues raised regarding the district's financial practices and "to ensure that state school aid is spent efficiently and effectively".

Controversy
On September 6, 2007, The FBI arrested five members of the Pleasantville school board as part of a federal corruption case that included several state lawmakers and other public officials. Included in the sweep were the arrests of Assemblymen Mims Hackett and Alfred E. Steele, and Passaic Mayor Samuel Rivera. Indictments were filed against four sitting members of the Board of Education charging that they had accepted bribes to steer insurance or roofing business from the district. Charged were Jayson Adams (accused of accepting $15,000 in bribes), James McCormick ($3,500), James Pressley ($32,200) and Rafael Velez ($14,000). Former board member Maurice 'Pete' Callaway, a current Pleasantville councilmember, was accused of accepting $13,000 in bribes as part of the scheme and was sentenced to 12 months in federal prison for his role as bagman in the scheme.

Schools
Schools in the district (with 2018–19 enrollment data from the National Center for Education Statistics) are:
Early childhood
Decatur Avenue Early Childhood Center with NA students in grade PreK
Sheila Ceasar, Early Childhood Supervisor
Elementary schools
Leeds Avenue School with 625 students in grades PreK-5
Lisa Stuart-Smith, Principal
North Main Street School with 372 students in grades PreK-5
Teresa McGaney-Guy, Principal
South Main Street School with 491 students in grades PreK-5
Dr. Felicia Hyman-Medley, Principal
Washington Avenue School with 425 students in grades K-5
Dr. Cynthia Ruiz-Cooper, Principal
Middle school
Pleasantville Middle School with 760 students in grades 6-8
 Stephen Townsend, Principal
Pleasantville High School with 828 students in grades 9-12
Howard Johnson, Principal

 Defunct schools
 In 1948, during de jure educational segregation in the United States, the district had a school for black children.

Administration
Core members of the district's administration are:
Natakie Chestnut-Lee, Superintendent of Schools
Daile Dixon-White, Business Administrator / Board Secretary

Board of education
The district's board of education, comprised of nine members, sets policy and oversees the fiscal and educational operation of the district through its administration. As a Type II school district, the board's trustees are elected directly by voters to serve three-year terms of office on a staggered basis, with three seats up for election each year held (since 2012) as part of the November general election. The board appoints a superintendent to oversee the district's day-to-day operations and a business administrator to supervise the business functions of the district.

References

External links
 

School Data for the Pleasantville Public Schools, National Center for Education Statistics

Pleasantville, New Jersey
New Jersey Abbott Districts
New Jersey District Factor Group A
School districts in Atlantic County, New Jersey